Rangkot  is a village development committee in Rolpa District in the Rapti Zone of north-eastern Nepal. At the time of the 1991 Nepal census it had a population of 3180 people living in 565 individual households.

References

Populated places in Rolpa District